Alika Hope is the founder and primary vocalist for the Ray of Hope Project. She was born in Oregon and received a Bachelor of Arts in sociology from the University of Notre Dame. Hope also minored in dance at St. Mary's College. She went on to receive a Master of Arts in early childhood special education from Teachers College at Columbia University.

Career

Opera career 
In 2003, Hope was the soloist singing "Ave Maria" National Shrine of The Divine Mercy on Divine Mercy Sunday. This performance was broadcast internationally on EWTN.

Theatre and singing 
Hope is a member of Actors Equity Association and was in a production of South Pacific in the 2000s. In 2012, she performed on The Island Lil as Junie. She has also portrayed Mrs. Muller in "Doubt" with Berkshire Actors Theatre. Her singing events can be found on BroadwayWorld. She participated in a Human Rights Festival in 2018 and an Arts Festival for Human Rights in New York in 2017.

Television 
Hope has been a co-host of CT Perspective TV on FOX-CT since 2013. She stars as Sandra in the comedy A Coupla Pros.

Pageants 
Hope was Ms. New England America for the 2019 Ms. America Pageant.

Ray of Hope Project 
Hope is the co-founder and president of The Ray of Hope Project, an organization with the goal of using African American spirituals to shed light on the combined anti-slavery efforts of blacks and whites in 19th century New England. The project includes nine musicians and actors who incorporate African American spirituals with live music in their participatory programs.

The Ray of Hope Project musicians and actors use historical records of successful African Americans to teach about slavery in America in the 1900s. Collaborations with schools, libraries and museums throughout the United States has allowed members to create poems and performance material. The project also uses the music and lyrics of 20th century social justice songs as a way of creating conversations around current issues of global social justice issues.

"Hope for a Motherless Child", the project's first album, was released in 2016 and won a "preferred choice" award for Kids CD in the 2016 Creative Child Magazine awards. It was also awarded a Global Music Award in June 2016.

In June, 2016, Hope and the Ray of Hope project participated in Old Sturbridge Village's Juneteenth/Freedom Week. She was interviewed by Connecticut Public Radio about the experience.

In an interview with Lioness magazine, Hope said that the motto of Ray of Hope Project is to "Feel the Music, Change the World"

In 2017, Ray of Hope created a music video "IRL" which focuses on the importance of exhibiting kindness in social media.

References 

1975 births
Living people
Singers from Oregon
University of Notre Dame alumni
Singers from New York City
Teachers College, Columbia University alumni
Catlin Gabel School alumni
21st-century American singers